Eberhard Goldhahn (8 March 1927 – 2 March 2022) was a German politician.

A member of the Christian Democratic Union of Germany, he served in the Volkskammer and the Bundestag in 1990.

Goldhahn died on 2 March 2022, at the age of 94.

References

1927 births
2022 deaths
20th-century German politicians
East German politicians
Members of the 10th Volkskammer
Members of the Bundestag 1990–1994
Members of the Bundestag for Brandenburg
Christian Democratic Union (East Germany) politicians
Christian Democratic Union of Germany politicians
Academic staff of the Humboldt University of Berlin
People from Erzgebirgskreis